First Congregational Church (First Church; United Church of Christ) is a United Church of Christ church located in downtown Atlanta at the corner of Courtland Street and John Wesley Dobbs Avenue (formerly Houston Street). It is notable for being the favored church of the city's black elite including Alonzo Herndon and Andrew Young, for its famous minister Henry H. Proctor, and for President Taft having visited in 1898.

The church is the second-oldest African-American Congregational Church in the United States. The American Missionary Association (AMA) established the Storrs School in Atlanta. The school served as a center for social services, education, and worship for newly freed blacks. Worshipers at the school's services petitioned for a church of their own. As a result, in May 1867 a Congregational Church was organized, and the AMA donated the land.  The church's first service was held on May 26, 1867, and its first ten members included Reverend and Mrs. Frederick Ayer and Atlanta University's first president Edmund Asa Ware.

The church was never formally segregated but had become mostly black by 1892. The current building is the second church, built on the site of the original one in 1908.

External links

Church Website
historic photo at Atlanta History Center website

References

United Church of Christ churches in Georgia (U.S. state)
Churches in Atlanta
African-American history in Atlanta
Churches on the National Register of Historic Places in Georgia (U.S. state)
Renaissance Revival architecture in Georgia (U.S. state)
Churches completed in 1908
National Register of Historic Places in Atlanta
City of Atlanta-designated historic sites
1867 establishments in Georgia (U.S. state)